A film format is a technical definition of a set of standard characteristics regarding image capture on photographic film for still images or film stock for filmmaking. It can also apply to projected film, either slides or movies. The primary characteristic of a film format is its size and shape.

In the case of motion picture film, the format sometimes includes audio parameters. Other characteristics usually include the film gauge, pulldown method, lens anamorphosis (or lack thereof), and film gate or projector aperture dimensions, all of which need to be defined for photography as well as projection, as they may differ.

Motion picture film formats

Digital camera formats

Photographic film formats

See also 
Film base
Keykode
Large format
Medium format
Microform

References

External links
Film Formats and HDTV
Table of Film formats Archive by Mark Baldock
Kodak roll films starting with 101
The history of Kodak roll films
Classic camera film sizes, sources, and film adapters, with spool dimensions
American Widescreen Museum
Sub-35 mm movie film formats history webpage
Plate and tintype sizes
Michael Rogge's brief history of film formats

Film and video technology